Ituglanis is a genus of small freshwater fish in the family Trichomycteridae native to South America. Their greatest diversity seems to occur in the Amazon River basin. Most species inhabit leaf litter, with several species living in caves.

This genus was first erected for nine species previously classified in Trichomycterus. Ituglanis is believed to be a monophyletic group. There may be two monophyletic groups within this genus. Ituglanis is currently considered a member of the subfamily Trichomycterinae though its position as a member of any of the current subfamilies has been questioned. Instead, it has been suggested to be the sister group of a large clade composed of the Glanapteryginae, Sarcoglanidinae, Stegophilinae, Tridentinae and Vandelliinae.

Species
There are currently 26 recognized species in this genus: 
 Ituglanis agreste S.M. Q. Lima, C. P. Neves & Campos-Paiva, 2013 
 Ituglanis amazonicus (Steindachner, 1882)
 Ituglanis apteryx Datovo, 2014 
 Ituglanis australis Datovo & de Pinna, 2014 
 Ituglanis bambui Bichuette & Trajano, 2004
 Ituglanis boitata Ferrer, Donin & L. R. Malabarba, 2015 
 Ituglanis boticario Rizzato & Bichuette, 2015 
 Ituglanis cahyensis Sarmento-Soares, Martins-Pinheiro, Aranda & Chamon, 2006 
 Ituglanis eichhorniarum (A. Miranda-Ribeiro, 1912) 
 Ituglanis epikarsticus Bichuette & Trajano, 2004
 Ituglanis goya Datovo, P. P. U. Aquino & Langeani, 2016 
 Ituglanis gracilior (C. H. Eigenmann, 1912)
 Ituglanis guayaberensis (Dahl, 1960)
 Ituglanis herberti (P. Miranda-Ribeiro, 1940)
 Ituglanis ina Wosiacki, Dutra & Mendonça, 2012 
 Ituglanis laticeps (Kner, 1863)
 Ituglanis macunaima Datovo & Landim, 2005 
 Ituglanis mambai Bichuette & Trajano, 2008 
 Ituglanis metae (C. H. Eigenmann, 1917)
 Ituglanis nebulosus de Pinna & Keith, 2003
 Ituglanis paraguassuensis Campos-Paiva & W. J. E. M. Costa, 2007 
 Ituglanis parahybae (C. H. Eigenmann, 1918)
 Ituglanis parkoi (P. Miranda-Ribeiro, 1944)
 Ituglanis passensis L. A. Fernández & Bichuette, 2002
 Ituglanis proops (A. Miranda-Ribeiro, 1908)
 Ituglanis ramiroi Bichuette & Trajano, 2004

References

Trichomycteridae
Catfish of South America
Catfish genera
Freshwater fish genera